There is recognition for the United States Champion Thoroughbred Trainer by earnings but no formal award is given to the trainer in Thoroughbred flat racing whose horses earned the most purse money in North American Thoroughbred racing.

Note that the figures includes earnings in Canada.

See also
 United States Champion Thoroughbred Trainer by wins

References

 
American Champion racehorse trainers
Horse racing in the United States
Racehorse training awards